is a Japanese monorail station of Osaka Monorail in Toyonaka, Osaka Prefecture, Japan. "Handai" is a nickname in Japanese for Osaka University, and this station is close to the university's Toyonaka Campus.

Lines
Osaka Monorail Main Line (Station Code: 13)

Layout
There is an island platform and two tracks elevated. The platform is sealed in with glass walls and doors.

History 
The station opened on September 30, 1994 as part of a  extension west from Senri-Chūō Station.

On 28 August 2021, the platform screen doors began operation.

Adjacent stations

References

Osaka Monorail stations
Osaka University transportation
Railway stations in Japan opened in 1994